Jason Licht (born February 13, 1971) is an American football executive who is the general manager of the Tampa Bay Buccaneers of the National Football League (NFL), a position he has held since 2014. Before joining the Bucs in 2014, Licht worked for the NFL's Miami Dolphins, Carolina Panthers, New England Patriots, Philadelphia Eagles and Arizona Cardinals. In his 26-year executive career, Licht has appeared in 5 Super Bowls, winning 2 of them with the Patriots in 2002 and Buccaneers in 2021, both led by Tom Brady. His other appearances were in 2005 with the Eagles, 2009 with the Cardinals, and 2012 with the Patriots.

Early life 
Licht was raised in Yuma, Colorado. He played linebacker for the University of Nebraska football team as a freshman in 1989 and offensive guard in 1991 before transferring to Nebraska Wesleyan University, where he played defensive tackle from 1992 to 1993. An all-conference defensive tackle at Nebraska-Wesleyan, Licht earned a bachelor's degree in Biology/Pre-Med. In the summer he worked as a bartender at The Brass Rail.

Career

Front office assistant 

In 1995, Licht was hired by then-Miami Dolphins scout Tom Heckert as a scouting assistant before serving as the Dolphins' offensive assistant/quality control coach in 1996. He then spent the 1997 season working for the college scouting agency National Football Scouting and the 1998 season in the Carolina Panthers' scouting department. From 1999 through 2000, Licht served as a college scout for the Patriots before being promoted to national scout for the 2001 season. He then was promoted to assistant director of player personnel in 2002, a position he held for one season before re-joining Heckert, then the Philadelphia Eagles' vice president of player personnel, in 2003 as the Eagles' assistant director of player personnel.

Upon Heckert's promotion to general manager in 2006, Licht was elevated to vice president of player personnel, but was fired by the team in May 2008. In June 2008, Licht was hired by the Arizona Cardinals as a personnel executive. He left the Cardinals and returned to the Patriots as their director of pro personnel in February 2009.

In 2012, Chicago Bears general manager Jerry Angelo was fired by the team. During the team's hunt, Licht was among the candidates for the general manager job, and he and Phil Emery were the two finalists. The Bears hired Emery, and Licht returned to Arizona as the Cardinals' director of player personnel beginning in 2012 and was promoted to vice president of player personnel in January 2013.

General manager 

On January 21, 2014, the Tampa Bay Buccaneers hired Licht as their general manager. Other candidates included Chris Ballard from the Kansas City Chiefs, Lionel Vital from the Atlanta Falcons and Marc Ross from the New York Giants. He signed a 4-year deal with a fifth-year team option. Licht was officially introduced at One Buc Place on January 23, 2014. In his first news conference, Licht talked about his plans: "Our philosophy is going to be to build through the draft. That's where we find our stars. That's where we find the next generation. But also in the short term and long term we're going to supplement our roster through free agency. But we're going to look for value. We're going to spend wisely." Despite the Bucs struggles for much of the 2010s, Licht survived 3 coaching changes (Lovie Smith, Dirk Koetter, and Bruce Arians), and they wouldn't make the playoffs under Licht's tenure until the 2020 season.

Jason Licht's Buccaneers won Super Bowl LV on February 7, 2021. His work in the trade market and free agency helped build his Super Bowl-winning roster. The acquisitions of players like Jason Pierre-Paul, Shaq Barrett, Leonard Fournette, Rob Gronkowski, Antonio Brown, Ndamukong Suh, and Super Bowl MVP Tom Brady were critical in Tampa Bay’s success, as all played big roles on Tampa's Super Bowl-winning team. Along with Licht’s ability in free agency, he was able to pick up star performers in the draft. He drafted players Mike Evans, Vita Vea, Carlton Davis III, Sean Murphy-Bunting, Devin White, Tristan Wirfs, Antoine Winfield Jr., and Chris Godwin, all key parts of their Super Bowl-winning team. Licht was also credited heavily for his efforts to retain key, highly touted, free agents Chris Godwin, Shaquil Barrett, and Lavonte David during the 2021 offseason with the use of salary cap savvy deals.

Personal life 
Licht and his wife, Blair, have two sons, Charlie and Theo, and a daughter, Zoe.

References

1971 births
Living people
American football defensive tackles
Arizona Cardinals executives
Carolina Panthers scouts
Miami Dolphins coaches
Miami Dolphins scouts
Nebraska Wesleyan Prairie Wolves football players
New England Patriots executives
New England Patriots scouts
Philadelphia Eagles executives
People from Fremont, Nebraska